European Physical Education Review is a quarterly peer-reviewed academic journal that covers the field of physical education including sport and leisure issues and research. The journal was established in 1995 and is published by SAGE Publications in association with the North West Counties Physical Education Association.

Abstracting and indexing 
The journal is abstracted and indexed in Scopus and the Social Sciences Citation Index. According to the Journal Citation Reports, its 2013 impact factor is 0.438, ranking it 154th out of 219 in the category "Education & Educational Research".

References

External links
 

Education journals
Quarterly journals
Publications established in 1995
SAGE Publishing academic journals
English-language journals